Nino Cipri is a science fiction writer, editor, and educator. Their works have been nominated for the Nebula, Hugo, Locus, World Fantasy, and Shirley Jackson Awards.

Personal life

Cipri identifies as queer and trans/nonbinary. A graduate of the 2014 Clarion Writers Workshop, they earned an MFA in fiction from the University of Kansas in 2019. Cipri has previously worked as a stagehand, bookseller, bike mechanic at Divvy, food columnist for a Chicago culture website, and as a labor organizer. Their partner is writer Nibedita Sen.

Career
Cipri says Kelly Link and Ursula Le Guin are two of their main influences, adding about Le Guin that "I was trying to teach myself how to write short stories, she was literally the first author I turned to." They also cite the importance to their writing of queer authors from the 1990s such as Poppy Z. Brite and comics like Hothead Paisan: Homicidal Lesbian Terrorist.

Their fiction has been published in a number of magazines and publications, including Tordotcom, Fireside Magazine, Nightmare Magazine, Daily Science Fiction and other places. Cipri's short story "The Shape of My Name," described as "a heart-rending vision of the struggles of time travelers bound to a single house and family," was a finalist for the 2015 Tiptree/Otherwise Award and was reprinted in the Tachyon Publications anthology The New Voices of Science Fiction, edited by Hannu Rajaniemi and Jacob Weisman. Their short story "Opals and Clay" was a finalist for the 2016 Tiptree/Otherwise Award.

Their novella Finna was published in 2020 by Tordotcom. It was followed by a sequel, Defekt, in 2021.

Awards and honors 
Cipri's first short story collection Homesick won the Dzanc Short Fiction Collection Prize and was a finalist for the World Fantasy and Shirley Jackson Awards. Their novella Finna is a finalist for the 2021 Nebula Award for Best Novella, Hugo Award for Best Novella, Locus Award for Best Novella, and Lambda Literary Award for Transgender Fiction.

Works

Novellas

Collections

Selected short stories

References

External links
 
 

Living people
American science fiction writers
University of Kansas alumni
Year of birth missing (living people)
American non-binary writers